
Zawiercie County is a unit of territorial administration and local government (powiat) in Silesian Voivodeship, southern Poland. It came into being on January 1, 1999, as a result of the Polish local government reforms passed in 1998.

As of 2019 its total population is 118,020. The most populated towns are Zawiercie with 49,334 inhabitants and Poręba with 8,525 inhabitants.

Neighbouring counties
Zawiercie County is bordered by Częstochowa County to the north, Włoszczowa County to the north-east, Jędrzejów County and Miechów County to the east, Olkusz County and the city of Dąbrowa Górnicza to the south, Będzin County to the south-west, and Myszków County to the west.

Administrative division
The county is subdivided into 10 gminas (two urban, four urban-rural and four rural). These are listed in the following table, in descending order of population.

References

 
Zawiercie